"Brilha la Luna" (lit. "Shine the Moon") is a song by the Brazilian girl group pop Rouge, from their second studio album C'est La Vie (2003). The song was released by Columbia Records as the album's lead single on May 6, 2003. It was written and produced by Rick Bonadio, being a mix of dance-pop and zouk that is heavily influenced by Latin music. "Brilha la Luna" has verses in Spanish, and in many cases, Portuñol. The membrer Luciana Andrade sings lead on the verses and bridge with the other members singing only the high harmony on the pre-chorus and second chorus. After Andrade's departure the group, the verses sung by Luciana were sung by Karin Hils and Fantine Thó, respectively.

"Brilha la Luna" received positive reviews from music critics who, found the song similar to "Ragatanga" and predicted that it would achieve the same success as the song. The video was well received, receiving the "Best Music Video" award in My 2003 Nick Award and an indication to MTV Video Music Brasil 2003. "Brilha la Luna" was commercially successful in the Brazil, peaking at number 1 for one week.

Part of the song's music video was recorded at Botanical Garden of São Paulo, and another part of a studio, with the same costumes as the album insert. "Brilha la Luna"  was performed many times on television. The group have performed the song on their five tours, from the Brilha la Tour (2003), Blá Blá Blá Tour, Mil e Uma Noites Tour (2005), Chá Rouge Tour (2017) and 15 Anos Tour (2018).

Background and release 
Following the success of the debut album, Rouge (2002), which sold more than 2 million copies, and the hit "Ragatanga", which was more than 2 months at the top of the charts, Sony Music decided to launch a new studio album of the band, following the same format of the first album, with the difference of bringing a new style for the group.

For that, was brought to the album the zouk rhythm that already was present in the musical scene mainly in Europe. The rhythm has a similarity with the lambada and it appeared in the Antilles. The song was released in April 2003.

Fantine Thó, also a member of the group, commented on the new work: 

A version entirely sung in Spanish, titled "Brilla la Luna", was made for the album Rouge En Español, but the album was not released due to the departure of Luciana Andrade. Even so, the song was released on the internet.

Composition and lyrics
"Brilha la Luna" was written and produced by Rick Bonadio, being a mix of dance-pop and zouk that is heavily influenced by Latin music.  Has verses in Spanish (mira que bella), and even Portuñol/Portunhol (una bela luna siempre vai brilhar) (a beautiful moon will always shine). The membrer Luciana Andrade sings lead on the verses and bridge with the other members singing only the high harmony on the pre-chorus and second chorus. The song begins with all the girls singing, "Quero uma noite pra bailar o zouk, Um grande amor e um belo luar..." (I want a night to dance the zouk, A great love and a beautiful moonlight ...). In the pre-chorus, Luciana sings, "Quero tanto estar contigo só mais uma vez, E poder bailar o zouk como a primeira vez." (I want so much to be with you just one more time), and to be able to dance zouk like the first time." In the chorus, they all sing, "Brilha la luna, oh, oh, oh, Mira que bela Brilha la luna, oh, oh, oh Una bela luna siempre vai brilhar." (The moon shines, oh, oh, oh, Look how beautiful the moon shines, oh, oh, oh A beautiful moon will always shine). In the bridge of the song, the girls sing, "Hala ban hala ban hala bin bin bun ban Hala hala ban hala bin hala bun."

Critical response
Denis Moreira, of the Diário de São Paulo, said that "Brilha la Luna" has, with certain differences, the same Caribbean accent as "Ragatanga", and said that the song is "lambada-like." Fernanda Castello Branco do Terra said that the song "promises to follow the same path of success that was Ragatanga."

Live performances
The song was performed many times on television, including on Gugu's show TV, singing the single "Brilha la Luna", he group also went to the Bom Dia & Cia children's show where they had an entire week of the show (Monday to Friday) dedicated to the girls who sang old and new hits such as "Ragatanga", "Brilha La Luna" and made an acapella of "Um Anjo Veio Me Falar", also gave interviews to TV host Jackeline Petkovic who also learned the choreographies of the Rouge, were also to Falando Francamente da Sônia Abrão, singing "Brilha la Luna", "Um Anjo Veio Me Falar", and an excerpt from the unpublished "Um Dia Sem Você", attending a fan request.

The band also went to Sabadaço, singing the singles "Brilha la Luna" and "Um Anjo Veio Me Falar", in addition to the title track "C'est La Vie." girls also promoted the album on Hebe'''s show, in addition to participating in the show's TV Eliana, É Show, Pânico na TV, Dia Dia, Melhor da Tarde and Chat Show Terra. After leaving Luciana, a new version of the song was made, to replace the two verses sung by her, Karin Hils and Fantine Thó, respectively, replaced the verses of the former member. The group have performed the song on their five tours, from the Brilha la Tour (2003), Blá Blá Blá Tour, Mil e Uma Noites Tour (2005), Chá Rouge Tour (2017) and 15 Anos Tour'' (2018).

Music video
In May, the girls announced that they would record part of the "Brilha La Luna", music video at Botanical Garden of São Paulo, and another part in a studio, with the same costumes as the CD insert. The music video counts on the combination of the two scenarios, in addition to much choreography.

The video for "Brilha la Luna" was nominated for MTV Video Music Brasil 2003 in the "Audience Choice" category and won the "Best Music Video" award in "Meus Prêmios Nick 2003."

Awards and nominations 
"Brilha La Luna" won several awards. The song won the "Best Music" awards at "Capricho Awards", "Meus Prêmios Nick", "Universal Musical Trophy" and the "Zero Magazine Award."

Awards

Track listings
 CD Single
 "Brilha La Luna"

Charts 
"Brilha la Luna" was commercially successful in the Brazil, peaking at number 1 for one week.

References

2003 songs
2003 singles
Rouge (group) songs
Dance-pop songs
Portuñol songs
Portuguese-language songs
Macaronic songs
Songs written by Rick Bonadio